What's Your Name may refer to:
What's Your Name?, a 1997 album by Adam Sandler
What's Your Name (album), a 2007 compilation album by Lynyrd Skynyrd
"What's Your Name" (Don and Juan song), a 1962 top-ten single written by Claude Johnston
"What's Your Name" (Lynyrd Skynyrd song), 1977
"What's Your Name" (Usher song), 2008
"What's Your Name", a 1969 single by The Music Explosion
"What's Your Name", a 1972 single by Chicory Tip
"What's Your Name", a 1974 single by The Moments
"What's Your Name", a 1981 single by DeBarge
"What's Your Name", a song on the 1994 Boston album Walk On
"What's Your Name?", a 2003 single by Morcheeba
"What's Your Name?", a song on the 2004 Jesse McCartney album Beautiful Soul
"What's Your Name?", a 2007 single by Cosmo4
"What's Your Name?", a song on the 2013 4Minute album Name Is 4Minute
"What's Your Name", a song on the 2015 Dillon Francis EP This Mixtape Is Fire

See also
"Wadsyaname", a 2007 song by Nelly
"What's Ur Name", a song on the 2008 Janet Jackson album Discipline